Ervin Baktay (1890–1963; born Ervin Gottesmann) was an author noted for popularizing Indian culture in Hungary.

He had started his career as a painter and he encouraged his niece Amrita Sher-Gil to pursue art.  Baktay gave up painting to study eastern religions and art, and became a renowned Indologist.

Family
Ervin Baktay was uncle to artist Amrita Sher-Gil and nephew to Nagybánya artist Alfréd Gottesmann (1872–1965).

Works
He translated the Kama Sutra in 1920 and then published a version of the Mahābhārata in 1923. In 1960, he produced a version of the Ramayana.

Selected publications
Baktay Ervin: Die Kunst Indiens; Übers. Edith Róth; Bearb. Heinz Kucharski; Berlin - Budapest, Terra - Akad. Verlag, 1963.

References

Hungarian Indologists
Hungarian Jews
People from Dunaharaszti
1890 births
1963 deaths
Place of birth missing
Burials at Farkasréti Cemetery